Vestheiene  is a neighbourhood in the city of Kristiansand in Agder county, Norway. It is located in the borough of Grim and in the district of Hellemyr. Vestheiene is located to the east of Breimyr and west of Hellemyrtoppen. Solkollen lies to the north of Vestheiene.

Transportation

References

Geography of Kristiansand
Neighbourhoods of Kristiansand